Estonia–Lithuania relations refer to the bilateral relations between Estonia and Lithuania. Estonia has an embassy in Vilnius. Lithuania has an embassy in Tallinn. Both countries are situated in the Baltic region and are the full members of NATO and the European Union.

History
Both countries were previously part of the Russian Empire and later occupied by the Soviet Union.

Lithuania and Estonia officially re-established their diplomatic relations on 16 June 1991.

Agreements
Many of the agreements between the two countries are trilateral with Latvia as the three Baltic states.

In 2004, the free trade agreement signed in 1992 between the Baltic states was superseded when all three countries joined the European Union.
.

In 2017, the two countries along with Latvia, signed a rail agreement. The agreement is a precondition for a possible high speed railway between the states.

See also
Foreign relations of Estonia
Foreign relations of Lithuania
2004 enlargement of the European Union

References

External links

  Embassy of the Republic of Estonia in the Republic of Lithuania
  Embassy of the Republic of Lithuania in the Republic of Estonia